Michael Fitzgerald (born ) is a New Zealand rugby union player currently playing for Kamaishi Seawaves in Japan.  He previously played for Leicester Tigers in England's Premiership Rugby, for the Chiefs in Super Rugby and Manawatu in the ITM Cup. His regular playing position is lock.

In 2013, he signed a contract extension with the Chiefs until 2015.

On 21 April 2015, it was announced he had signed for English Aviva Premiership side Leicester Tigers. Fitzgerald made his Leicester debut on 18 October 2015 in a 28–16 win against London Irish. Fitzgerald played 25 times for Leicester that season, including scoring a try in their Champions Cup quarter final victory over Stade Français.

On 15 May 2019 he was announced as one of the players to leave Leicester following the end of the 2018–19 Premiership Rugby season and join Kamaishi Seawaves in Japan.

External links
Chiefs profile
Manawatu profile
Yahoo NZ profile
itsrugby.co.uk profile

References

Living people
1987 births
New Zealand rugby union players
Chiefs (rugby union) players
Rugby union locks
Manawatu rugby union players
Rugby union players from Auckland
People educated at Wanganui High School
Leicester Tigers players
New Zealand expatriate rugby union players
New Zealand expatriate sportspeople in England
Expatriate rugby union players in England